David Wilson Beaubier (May 2, 1864 in St. Mary's, Province of CanadaSeptember 1, 1938) was a Canadian politician. Beaubier ran in the elections of 1925 and 1926 but lost both to Robert Forke. He was elected to the House of Commons of Canada in the 1930 election as a Member of the historical Conservative Party for the riding of Brandon. He was re-elected in 1935. Prior to his federal political experience, he was a Lieutenant-Colonel during World War I in which he led the 181st Battalion, CEF into England in 1916.

External links
 

1864 births
1938 deaths
Conservative Party of Canada (1867–1942) MPs
Members of the House of Commons of Canada from Manitoba